Bhaleshwor Mahadev is a Hindu temple located in Chandragiri hill in south-west side of Kathmandu Valley. It is dedicated to Lord Shiva. It is located at the altitude of 2551 meters above sea level. The temple was built by Chandragiri Hills on the historic and religious site. The temple was designed by the architect Shankar Nath Rimal. The temple is connected to the Kathmandu valley by a cable car.

Mythological significance 
It is believed that Sati Devi, first consort of Shiva, sacrificed her own life at Daksha Prajapati’s yagna after Daksha insulted Shiva in front of other deities. Shiva, enraged with Sati Devi's death, carried her dead body on his back and walked across the world in rage. Shiva, blinded by rage, did not realize that Sati Devi’s decaying body was falling apart. Sati Devi's body parts fell down to different parts of the world. Pilgrimages were later established at these sites. Bhaleshwor Mahadev temple is believed to have been built at one of these sites, where Sati Devi's forehead ('Bhala') had fallen.

In Nepal Bhasa the hill is known as  Gon:ga Danda (it is converted its name from Gon:ga means bhalay (Nepali) and Danda means hills). It is also known as Ichheshwor Mahadev.

Historical significance 
The hill on which the temple is situated is related to the unification of Nepal campaign. On his way back to Gorkha from his in-laws in Makwanpur, Prithvi Narayan Shah had planned to make Kathmandu Valley the capital of a unified Nepal for the first time from Chandragiri hill.

Temple complex 
The temple complex also consists of idols of multiple Hindu gods and goddesses. There is a view tower, restaurant, food stalls, gift stores, banquet, 3D hall as well as an amusement park for children near the temple on the hill.

Gallery

See also 

 Gokarneshwor Mahadev temple
 Doleshwor Mahadeva Temple
 Kailashnath Mahadev Statue

References

Hindu temples in Bagmati Province
18th-century establishments in Nepal